Cercopithifilaria is a genus of nematodes belonging to the family Onchocercidae.

The species of this genus are found in Japan, Australia.

Species:

Cercopithifilaria bainae 
Cercopithifilaria crassa
Cercopithifilaria grassi 
Cercopithifilaria japonica
Cercopithifilaria longa
Cercopithifilaria minuta
Cercopithifilaria multicauda
Cercopithifilaria roussilhoni
Cercopithifilaria rugosicauda 
Cercopithifilaria shohoi
Cercopithifilaria tumidicervicata

References

Nematodes